Plinabulin (provisional name BPI-2358, formerly NPI-2358) is a small molecule under development by BeyondSpring Pharmaceuticals, and is in a world-wide Phase 3 clinical trial for non-small cell lung cancer.  Plinabulin is being investigated for the reduction of chemotherapy-induced neutropenia and for anti-cancer effects in combination with immune checkpoint inhibitors and in KRAS mutated tumors.

Plinabulin blocks the polymerization of tubulin in a unique manner, resulting in multi-factorial effects including an enhanced immune-oncology response, activation of the JNK pathway and disruption of the tumor blood supply.

References

Diketopiperazines
Imidazoles
Experimental cancer drugs
Tert-butyl compounds